Kembangan MRT station is an above-ground Mass Rapid Transit (MRT) station on the East West Line in Bedok, Singapore. Built at the junction of Sims Ave East and Jalan Kembangan, part of the station stands directly above the Siglap Canal. The name Kembangan means “expansion” in Malay.

History

As with most of the above-ground stations built in the past along the East West Line, it was built without platform screen doors. After several successful test at Jurong East, Yishun and Pasir Ris and eventually, installation of the half-height screen doors to prevent commuters from falling onto the train tracks. Installation started in December 2010 and the platform screen doors started operations on 25 February 2011 with Kallang.

This station is also installed with high-volume low-speed fans, which started operating 14 July 2012, together with Paya Lebar station.

Privacy screens were installed from Kembangan MRT station to Lorong Mydin to minimise noise impact from residents, from September 2016.

References

External links
 

Railway stations in Singapore opened in 1989
Bedok
Mass Rapid Transit (Singapore) stations